Thomas Frederick "Fred" Samuel (8 January 1897 – ) was a Welsh rugby union, and professional rugby league footballer who played in the 1920s. He played representative level rugby union (RU) for Wales, and at club level for New Dock Stars RFC, Llanelli RFC and Mountain Ash RFC, as a fullback, i.e. number 15, and club level rugby league (RL) for Hull F.C.

Background
Fred Samuel born in Llanelli, Wales.

International honours
Fred Samuel won caps for Wales (RU) while at Mountain Ash RFC in 1922 against Scotland, Ireland, and France.

References

External links
 Search for "Samuel" at rugbyleagueproject.org

 Statistics at scrum.com
 Statistics at wru.co.uk

1897 births
1941 deaths
Hull F.C. players
Llanelli RFC players
Mountain Ash RFC players
New Dock Stars RFC players
Rugby union fullbacks
Rugby league players from Llanelli
Wales international rugby union players
Welsh rugby league players
Welsh rugby union players
Rugby union players from Llanelli